Icelandic National Day (the day of the nation's celebration) is an annual holiday in Iceland which commemorates the foundation of The Republic of Iceland on 17 June 1944. This date also marks the end of Iceland's centuries old ties with Denmark. The date was chosen to coincide with the birthday of Jón Sigurðsson, a major figure of Icelandic culture and the leader of the 19th century Icelandic independence movement.

History

The formation of the republic was based on a clause in the 1918 Act of Union with Denmark, which allowed for a revision in 1943, as well as the results of the 1944 plebiscite.

German occupation of Denmark meant that the revision of the Act of Union could not take place in 1943. However, the referendum on abolishing the monarchy went ahead in 1944 while Denmark was still occupied by Germany and was overwhelmingly approved. At the time, the US Military had taken over the defence of Iceland at Iceland's invitation, after being occupied by Britain in 1940. Although saddened by the results of the plebiscite, King Christian X sent a letter on 17 June 1944 congratulating Icelanders on the establishment of a republic.

Abolishing the monarchy resulted in little change to the Icelandic constitution, instances of "The King" simply being changed to "The President". Icelanders celebrated the severing of all formal ties with Denmark after centuries of sometimes difficult Danish rule. Iceland's national day was chosen as the birthday of Jón Sigurðsson who pioneered the early independence movement. Sveinn Björnsson became the country's first president.

Celebrations
Today, Icelanders celebrate this holiday on a national scale. The celebration traditionally take the form of parades through each city, town, or village usually with a brass band leading the way. Riders on Icelandic horses often precede the brass band while a flag-bearing troop from the Icelandic scout movement traditionally follow the band. After the parade speeches are held out in the open, including one from Fjallkonan (the woman of the mountain), clad in Skautbúningur, who recites a poem. She represents the fierce spirit of the Icelandic nation and of Icelandic nature. In many ways this recalls the period of romanticism that reigned when the first steps toward independence were taken. After the public speeches are over, less formal celebrations ensue, usually including a variety of musical performances.

References

External links 
 Information for Reykjavik city celebration with program in Icelandic, English and Polish
 Independence Day pictures
 About Iceland

1944 establishments in Iceland
Icelandic culture
June observances
Annual events in Iceland
Iceland
Summer events in Iceland
Public holidays in Iceland